The Campeche catshark (Parmaturus campechiensis) is a catshark of the family Schyliorhinidae. It is known only from the holotype, a 15.7 cm immature female found in the northwestern Bay of Campeche in the Gulf of Mexico. The specimen was collected at 1,057 m, a depth beyond current and probably future fishing pressure in the region. The reproduction of this catshark is oviparous.

References

 

Campeche catshark
Fish of the Gulf of Mexico
Taxa named by Stewart Springer
Campeche catshark